Lilium speciosum is an East Asian species of plants in the lily family. It is sometimes called the Japanese lily though there are other species with this common name.

The flowers are white to pink in colour, and strongly scented. It is later flowering than most other species. Many garden forms are in cultivation, and the species has been widely used for breeding of garden forms.

Lilium speciosum contains phenolic glycosides, such as 6′-O-feruloylsucrose and (25R,26R)-26-methoxyspirost-5-en-3β-ol 3-O-α-l-rhamnopyranosyl-(1→2)-β-d-glucopyranoside, and steroidal saponins.

Varieties
 Lilium speciosum var. gloriosoides Baker -  China, Taiwan
 Lilium speciosum var. speciosum - Japan (Shikoku, Kyushu)

Toxicity
Lily pollen is toxic to domestic cats and ingestion is often fatal; households and gardens which are visited by cats are advised against growing lilies or placing lily flowers where a cat may brush against them and become dusted with pollen, which they then consume while cleaning. Suspected cases require urgent veterinary attention. Prompt treatment with activated charcoal and/or induced vomiting can reduce the amount of toxin absorbed, and large amounts of fluid by IV can reduce damage to kidneys to increase the chances of survival.

References

External links
Dave's Garden plantfile
Heritage Perennials plant profile in English with photo
Pacific Bulb Society, Lilium Oriental Section photos of flowers and bulbs of several species

speciosum
Flora of Southeast China
Flora of Eastern Asia
Plants described in 1792
Garden plants